Sergio Bucher Rodriguez (born November 1963) is a dual-nationality Spanish/Swiss businessman. He became the chief executive of Debenhams in October 2016, succeeding Michael Sharp. He stepped down in 2019 as the business was taken over by lenders. He currently serves as Member of the executive board for the Otto Group  and Non-executive director for Namshi.com in Dubai.

Early life
He is half Spanish and half-Swiss. He studied Applied Mathematics Engineering at the École Polytechnique Fédérale de Lausanne.

Career
From 1987 to 1997 he worked for DuPont. He worked from 1998 to 2000 at Grupo Cortefiel in Spain, then from 2000 to 2003 at Inditex in Spain where he founded Inditex's lingerie chain Oysho. From 2004 to 2008 he was general manager for Retail at Nike, Inc. for EMEA, and retail director of Spain and Portugal. He worked from 2009 to 2013 for Puma SE as general manager of global retail.

From 2013 to 2016 he headed  Amazon's fashion business in Europe  where he centralised fashion activities and opened one of the largest digital content factories in Europe in Shoreditch (London) 

In May 2016, it was announced that he would become the chief executive of Debenhams in October 2016. Sergio Bucher was at the helm for three years and oversaw its collapse into administration.

In February 2020, he joined the Otto Group (Otto GmbH) as member of the executive board for Retail and Brands  where he oversees a portfolio of multichannel companies such as Crate & Barrel, Freemans & Grattan plc, Manufactum or the sourcing operations of the Otto Group.

References

1963 births
Debenhams
DuPont people
École Polytechnique Fédérale de Lausanne alumni
Inditex
Living people
Nike, Inc. people
Puma (brand)
Swiss people of Spanish descent